2,5-Dimethoxy-4-methylphenylcyclopropylamine (DMCPA) is a lesser-known psychedelic drug and a substituted amphetamine. DMCPA was first synthesized by Alexander Shulgin. In his book PiHKAL, the dosage range is listed as 15–20 mg and the duration is listed as 4–8 hours. DMCPA produces open-eye visuals, anorexia, and psychedelic dreams. Shulgin gives it a +++ on the Shulgin Rating Scale.

Legality

United Kingdom
This substance is a Class A drug in the Drugs controlled by the UK Misuse of Drugs Act.

Pharmacology
Very little data exists about the pharmacological properties, metabolism, and toxicity of DMCPA.

See also 
 Phenethylamine
 Psychedelics, dissociatives and deliriants
 Tranylcypromine

References

Psychedelic phenethylamines
Cyclopropanes